Celebrity Overhaul was a reality television and infotainment show on Australia's Nine Network in which celebrities undergo a rigorous exercise and diet regime aimed at improving their fitness, health and general lifestyle, with the particular goal of Weight Loss.  These are coordinated by two personal trainers and a medical doctor.  Hosted by Deborah Hutton, there have been two seasons, (5 episodes x 1 hour) each respectively in 2004 and 2005.

Featured Celebrities 
Merv Hughes – cricketer (Seasons 1 and 2) 
Paulini Curuenavuli – singer and Australian Idol contestant.
Rowena Wallace – actress (Season 1)
Kate Fischer – model/former actress (Season 2)
Ita Buttrose – journalist/businesswoman (Season 2)
Phil Burton – singer (Human Nature) (Season 2)
Fabio Lanzoni – model and actor
Trevor Butler – Big Brother reality show contestant
Melissa Bell – actress and singer
Nova Peris – athlete and politician
Peter Phelps – actor
Dr John Tickell – media personality, television presenter/doctor

Spin -off 
Channel Nine spun another show from Celebrity Overhaul, known simply as "Overhaul" which followed a similar format, except but did not feature celebrities.

External links
Celebrity Overhaul at the National Film and Sound Archive

2000s Australian reality television series
Nine Network original programming
2004 Australian television series debuts
2005 Australian television series endings